Mizen (not to  be confused with ) may refer to:

 Mizen Head, one of the extreme points of the island of Ireland
 Mizen potato, a potato variety
 Jimmy Mizen, a 16-year-old boy killed in May 2008 in London.